Youssef Badra (born July 5, 1984) is a Tunisian judoka, who played for the half-middleweight category. He is a two-time African judo champion, and a gold medalist for his division at the 2007 All-Africa Games in Algiers, Algeria.

Badra represented Tunisia at the 2008 Summer Olympics in Beijing, where he competed for the men's half-middleweight class (81 kg). He lost the first preliminary round match, by two yuko and a false attack penalty (P12), to Montenegro's Srđan Mrvaljević.

References

External links

NBC Olympics Profile

Tunisian male judoka
Living people
Olympic judoka of Tunisia
Judoka at the 2008 Summer Olympics
1984 births
African Games gold medalists for Tunisia
African Games medalists in judo
Competitors at the 2007 All-Africa Games
20th-century Tunisian people
21st-century Tunisian people